Fort Holland (also referred to as Camp Holland) is a ghost town and former military installment in Presidio County, Texas. It is located west of the city of Valentine.

History
Fort Holland was built at Viejo Pass to defend against bandits led by Francisco Villa in 1918. Construction occurred on the site of the last battle between United States cavalry and the Apache Indians on June 12, 1880, a skirmish won by U.S. troops. Made of stone and wood, Fort Holland's construction was at a total cost of over $16,000. The installment was closed after World War I's end in 1921 as border patrols were no longer necessary in the area.

References

External links
 

Ghost towns in Texas
Unincorporated communities in Presidio County, Texas
Unincorporated communities in Texas